The Movement for the Reorganization of the Communist Party of Greece 1918–1955, is an anti-revisionist Marxist–Leninist communist party in Greece. It is better known as Anasintaxi (Reorganization).

History
Anasintaxi was established in 1996. It is a Marxist-Leninist organization which struggles for the union of all Greek communists in one Marxist-Leninist-Stalinist party. It occurred from the union of small Marxist-Leninist groups such as Movement for a United Communist Party of Greece and Post-Soviet Epoch mainly consisted of exiled Greek communists from the former Soviet Union and old EAM-ELAS soldiers and officers.

The members of Anasintaxi claim that today's KKE has no relation with the party before its destalinization in the period 1955–1956, and that the new party's leaders betrayed Nikolaos Zachariadis, the General Secretary of the Communist Party of Greece (KKE) until 1955. In order to make a distinction between the old party and the new party that arose after 1955, they refer to today's KKE as "K"KE or "K"KE('56), adding scare quotes around the first K, which corresponds to the word communist.

In contradiction with other anti-revisionist organisations, Anasintaxi uses regularly the term Stalinism. The movement criticized Ludo Martens as a revisionist and defender of Mikhail Gorbachev, and his book Another View of Stalin as a fundamentally anti-Stalin book.

The organization publishes a biweekly four-page newspaper called Anasintaxi.

Anasintaxi is an active participant in the International Conference of Marxist-Leninist Parties and Organizations (Unity & Struggle).

It has not participated in any elections.

See also
Politics of Greece

References

External links
, mainly in Greek
Anasintaxi's English blog, in English

1996 establishments in Greece
Communist parties in Greece
Anti-revisionist organizations
Stalinist parties
Hoxhaist parties
Far-left politics in Greece
International Conference of Marxist–Leninist Parties and Organizations (Unity & Struggle)
Political parties established in 1996